Helen Louise Caines  is a Professor of Physics at Yale University. She studies the quark–gluon plasma and is the co-spokesperson for the STAR experiment.

Education 
Caines studied physics at the University of Birmingham and graduated in 1992. She earned her PhD at the University of Birmingham in 1996.

Career and research

In 1996 she joined Ohio State University. She was elected a junior representative of the STAR experiment in 1998. Caines was appointed to Yale University in 2004. She studies the quark–gluon plasma, working alongside John Harris. She uses heavy-ion experiments to study quantum chromodynamics in extreme conditions. She studies the quark–gluon plasma. Her measurements indicated the quark–gluon plasma is the most vortical fluid ever known. In 2005 she became a council member of the STAR experiment advisory board. She investigated soft physics. She was elected a fellow of the Institute of Physics in 2008. She was promoted to Associate Professor with tenure in 2007.

She developed the STAR detector, a solenoidal tracker to measure hadronic particle production. She works on the Au-Au collisions at √sNN = 7.7 to 200 GeV. They demonstrated that when two gold ions collide, negatively and positive charged particles flow out in a chiral magnetic effect. She also looks at the product of two colliding ruthenium ions, which creates a strong magnetic field. Along with Zhangbu Xu, Caines was appointed co-spokesperson for the STAR experiment in 2017. The STAR experiment is part of the Relativistic Heavy Ion Collider at Brookhaven National Laboratory. 

She served as a member for the Nuclear Science Advisory Committee at the United States Department of Energy from 2016. She contributes to the United States Long Range Plan for Nuclear Physics. She has explored how artificial neural networks can be used to identify quark jets. She serves as a member of the American Physical Society Education Committee.

Caines taught a Being Human in STEM course at Yale University. The class examines how socioeconomic background, gender, race, religion and sexuality shape the STEM experience. The course was modelled on a similar program at Amherst College.

Awards and honours 
Caines was elected a fellow of the American Physical Society in 2018 and a Fellow of the Institute of Physics (FInstP). In 2003 she was awarded an Engineering and Physical Sciences Research Council advanced research fellowship.

References 

Year of birth missing (living people)
Living people
Fellows of the Institute of Physics
Women nuclear physicists
Brookhaven National Laboratory staff
Yale University faculty
American women physicists
Alumni of the University of Birmingham
Fellows of the American Physical Society
American women academics
21st-century American women